Herz Jesu Oberrad (Sacred Heart, literally: Heart of Jesus, German: Herz-Jesu-Kirche) is a  Catholic church in the suburb Oberrad of Frankfurt am Main, Hesse, Germany. The parish church of the Oberrad congregation is part of the Diocese of Limburg. It is a Kirchort (church location), part of the parish St. Bonifatius Frankfurt.

The church was built in 1893 after designs by the architect  in Gothic revival style.

References

External links 

 

Roman Catholic churches in Frankfurt
Churches in the Diocese of Limburg